Subhash Sachdeva (born 25 April 1956) is a leader of Bharatiya Janata Party and a former member of the Delhi Legislative Assembly. He was elected to the assembly first time in 2004 by election from Moti Nagar and was reelected in 2008 and 2013. .

References

1956 births
Living people
Place of birth missing (living people)
Delhi MLAs 2013–2015
Bharatiya Janata Party politicians from Delhi